May the Lord Watch is the fifth studio album by American hip-hop duo Little Brother. It was released on August 20, 2019 by Imagine Nation Music, For Members Only Records and Empire Distribution.

The album is the duo's first album since 2010's Leftback release.

Background
The album's development secretly began during the previous year of 2018, after Rapper Big Pooh, Phonte and 9th Wonder reunited during September's Art of Cool festival. However, this wasn't made public until shortly after Big Pooh and Phonte announced the group's reunion as a duo in May 2019. Like the previous album Leftback, there was no production input from 9th, who departed the group to embark on a solo career as a producer and label CEO. Instead, the album was primarily produced by longtime collaborators and Soul Council members Nottz and Khrysis. Other producers such as Black Milk, Focus..., Devin Morrison, Blaaq Gold, and even Phonte himself also contributed to the album's production. Sharing continuity with The Minstrel Show, the album's theme continues the running concept of a fictional television network called UBN, which is a satire of stereotypical programs, advertisements, and pop-culture for African-Americans. A notable moment on the album was a skit from Peter Rosenberg announcing the death of Phonte's alter-ego Percy Miracles ( previously appeared on The Minstrel Show album track "Cheatin'"), which served as a tribute to Phife Dawg, and how his death was a significant moment that brought Phonte and Pooh back together.

In multiple interviews and podcasts - including the Premium Pete Show - it was revealed that 9th Wonder was originally supposed to be a part of the reunion album, under its original title Homecoming. The title was changed due to Beyonce releasing Homecoming: The Live Album to coincide with her concert film Homecoming. Phonte and Pooh decided to continue the project without 9th after a series of creative differences, mostly regarding production for the album.

Critical reception

May the Lord Watch was met with universal acclaim reviews from critics. At Metacritic, which assigns a weighted average rating out of 100 to reviews from mainstream publications, this release received an average score of 86, based on 5 reviews.

Track listing
Credits adapted from istandard producers

Samples
 "The Feel" contains a sample of "A Man Alone", as performed by Alan Hawkshaw
 "Everything" contains a sample of "In My Life", as performed by Mahavishnu Orchestra
 "Black Magic (Make It Better)" contains a sample of "The Chase", as performed by Anderson .Paak 
 "Goodmorning Sunshine" contains a sample of "Eternal Love", as performed by Utopia
 "Sittin' Alone" contains a sample of "Open Your Eyes", as performed by Bobby Caldwell

Personnel

 Phonte - writer, performer, recording engineer, mixing, additional background vocals, executive producer
 Rapper Big Pooh - writer, performer, executive producer
 Peter Rosenberg - voice 
 Questlove - voice 
 Jemele Hill - voice
 Laiya St. Clair - voice
 Joe Scudda - voice 
 Evan Pollock - voice
 Dyana Williams - voice
 Jermaine White - voice
 Devon Moore - voice
 Ryan Davis - voice
 Austin Hall - voice
 Cesar Comanche - voice
 BlakkSoul - writer, background vocals
Darien Brockington - background vocals

 Carlitta Durand - background vocals
 Shana Tucker - background vocals
 Madison McFerrin - background vocals 
 Kristi Ae - background vocals
 Tamisha Waden - background vocals
 Be My Fiasco - background vocals
 Carmen Rodgers - background vocals
 Lorenzo "Zo!" Ferguson - keys, additional keys, additional synths
 Sheldon Williams - keys and synths
 Nottz - drums, bass
 Nicolay - keys
 Howard "Soul" Joyner - keys
 Chris Boerner - recording, mixing, mastering
 Antoine Lyers - photography
 Tobias Rose - graphic layout, design
 Deborah Mannis-Gardner (DMG Clearances, Inc) - sample clearance

Charts

References

2019 albums
Little Brother (group) albums
Empire Distribution albums
Albums produced by Black Milk
Albums produced by Focus...
Albums produced by Khrysis
Albums produced by Nottz